The 2007 Austrian Open was the thirty-sixth edition of the Austrian Open and it took place from July 23–30, 2007.

Philipp Kohlschreiber and Stefan Koubek were the defending champions, but none competed this year, as both players were focusing on the singles tournament.

Luis Horna and Potito Starace won the title by defeating Tomas Behrend and Christopher Kas 7–6(7–4), 7–6(7–5) in the final.

Seeds

Draw

Draw

References
 Main Draw (ATP)

Doubles